The Gergovie plateau is a plateau of the Massif Central located 10 km to the south of Clermont-Ferrand, Puy-de-Dôme, Auvergne, France and is named after the nearby village of Gergovie.  It is the  site of the Battle of Gergovia between Vercingetorix and Julius Caesar in 52 BC.

Location 
The plateau is located at 744 meters above sea level, and from it can be seen Chaîne des Puys, Clermont-Ferrand, and the Plaine des Sarlièves (Plain of Sarlièves), along with the Zénith d'Auvergne and the Puy de Sancy which dominates the Auvergne from it position 1886m above sea level.

Attractions 
A reconstructed "Gallic hut", with an accompanying permanent exhibition ("La Maison de Gergovie") can be seen on the plateau.

Events

Cervolix 
"Cervolix" - an association of kite fliers and kite surfers on the plateau.  It is also used, since 1995, by remote-controlled aircraft fliers.

Les Arverniales 
"Les Arverniales" is an archaeological festival held on the plateau, consisting of two days of  reconstructions, experimental archeology and living history displays.

Exhibitions 

Sculptures by Yves Guérin have also been displayed on the plateau since January 2007.

See also
 Gergovie Monument

External links 
 Tourist office of Gergovie Val d'Allier 
 Summary of the plateau's history
 "Les Arverniales", 2006
 Cervolix

Plateaus of Metropolitan France
Landforms of Puy-de-Dôme
Landforms of Auvergne-Rhône-Alpes